Robert Crook was an American politician.

Robert Crook may also refer to:
Robert A. Crook (born 1964), American folk artist
Robert Crook (MP), MP for Barnstaple